Sacha Valleau (born 8 October 1996) is a French rugby sevens player. He represented  at the 2016 Summer Olympics. He is a fan of EFL Championship side Fulham FC.

References

External links 
 
 
 
 
 

1996 births
Living people
Male rugby sevens players
Rugby sevens players at the 2016 Summer Olympics
Olympic rugby sevens players of France
France international rugby sevens players
Rugby sevens players at the 2014 Summer Youth Olympics
Youth Olympic gold medalists for France
Rugby Club Vannes players
French rugby union players